Beta Sextantis, Latinized from β Sextantis, is a variable star in the equatorial constellation of Sextans. With an apparent visual magnitude of 5.07, it is faintly visible to the naked eye on a dark night. According to the Bortle scale, it can be viewed from brighter lit suburban skies. The distance to this star, based upon an annual parallax shift of 8.96 mas, is around 364 light years.

This star served as a primary standard in the MK spectral classification system with a stellar classification of B6 V, indicating that it is a B-type main sequence star. However, Houk and Swift (1999) list a classification of B5 IV/V, suggesting it may be transitioning into a subgiant star. It has served as a uvby photometric standard, but is also categorized as an Alpha2 Canum Venaticorum variable with a suspected period of 15.4 days. This lengthy a period conflicts with a relatively high projected rotational velocity of 85 km/s, leaving the explanation for the variance unresolved.

References

Alpha2 Canum Venaticorum variables
B-type main-sequence stars
Sextantis, Beta
Sextans (constellation)
Durchmusterung objects
Sextantis, 30
051437
090994
04119